Hastings is a town in Jefferson County, Oklahoma, United States. The population was 143 at the 2010 census, a decline of 7.8 percent from the figure of 155 in 2000.

History
A community called Bayard existed at the site of present-day Hastings until the Kiowa, Comanche, and Apache Reservation was opened to new settlers on August 6, 1901. Since Indian Territory already had a post office named "Baird", the postal department named the station it established at this location. A couple of residents had suggested naming it for their hometown of Hastings, Nebraska. That was accepted by postal officials.

In 1902, a railroad line called the Enid and Anadarko built tracks through Hastings. The population was 560 in 1907 and 727 in 1910. The population has declined nearly continuously from 1910 until the present.

Geography

Demographics

As of the census of 2000, there were 155 people, 72 households, and 50 families residing in the town. The racial makeup of the town was 93.55% White, 1.29% African American, 3.87% Native American, and 1.29% from two or more races.

There were 72 households, out of which 16.7% had children under the age of 18 living with them, 61.1% were married couples living together, 6.9% had a female householder with no husband present, and 29.2% were non-families. 25.0% of all households were made up of individuals, and 15.3% had someone living alone who was 65 years of age or older. The average household size was 2.15 and the average family size was 2.57.

In the town, the population was spread out, with 14.8% under the age of 18, 4.5% from 18 to 24, 20.0% from 25 to 44, 32.9% from 45 to 64, and 27.7% who were 65 years of age or older. The median age was 53 years. For every 100 females, there were 96.2 males. For every 100 females age 18 and over, there were 97.0 males.

The median income for a household in the town was $22,969, and the median income for a family was $23,281. Males had a median income of $25,357 versus $17,083 for females. The per capita income for the town was $13,017. About 14.8% of families and 19.1% of the population were below the poverty line, including 40.0% of those under the age of eighteen and 17.5% of those 65 or over.

Notable person
 John Green, football player

References

External links
 Encyclopedia of Oklahoma History and Culture - Hastings

Towns in Jefferson County, Oklahoma
Towns in Oklahoma
Populated places established in 1901